The Suite Life on Deck is a Disney Channel original series, which aired for three seasons on Disney Channel from September 26, 2008 to May 6, 2011.

Series overview

Episodes

Season 1 (2008–09) 
 This season consists of 21 episodes.

Season 2 (2009–10) 
 This season consists of 28 episodes.

Season 3 (2010–11) 
 This season consists of 22 episodes.

Film (2011)

See also 
 List of The Suite Life of Zack & Cody episodes
 List of Wizards of Waverly Place episodes - includes "Cast-Away (To Another Show)", part one of 'Wizards on Deck with Hannah Montana' crossover
 List of Hannah Montana episodes - includes "Super(stitious) Girl", part three of 'Wizards on Deck with Hannah Montana' crossover
 List of I'm in the Band episodes - includes crossover episode "Weasels on Deck"

References 

General references that apply to most episodes

External links 
 List of The Suite Life on Deck episodes at Zap2it
 List of The Suite Life on Deck episodes at Yahoo! TV

Lists of American sitcom episodes
Lists of American children's television series episodes
Lists of Disney Channel television series episodes
 

it:Zack e Cody sul ponte di comando#Episodi